Eagle Island State Park is a public recreation area in south Puget Sound occupying the entirety of Eagle Island in Pierce County, Washington. The island was named for Harry Eagle, one of the party members of the Wilkes Expedition of 1841.

Park activities include picnicking, beachcombing, birdwatching, and wildlife viewing. A primitive trail runs through thick brush with short spurs that lead to the beach. The narrow beach is mostly gravel with the exception of a point of sand on the south end of the island. Three moorage buoys are available for boaters. The park is administered as a satellite of Jarrell Cove State Park.

References

External links
Eagle Island State Park Washington State Parks and Recreation Commission

State parks of Washington (state)
Parks in Pierce County, Washington
Uninhabited islands of Washington (state)